Moses Tran Clegg (September 1, 1876 – August 9, 1918) was an American bacteriologist noted for his work in Leprosy. He is best known as the first scientist to segregate and propagate the leprosy bacillus.

Early life
Clegg was born on September 1, 1876, at Red Bluff, Arkansas, and educated at the University of Arkansas. After a period of service in Company A, 1st Arkansas Infantry during the Spanish–American War, he enlisted in the Hospital Corps, serving through the Philippine Insurrection.

Career
Clegg was assistant bacteriologist in the Philippine Bureau of Science at Manila from 1902 to 1910, assistant director of the Leprosy Investigation Station in Hawaii from 1910 to 1915, and bacteriologist at San Francisco from 1916 to 1917. At the time of his death, he was superintendent of Queen's Hospital, Honolulu.

See also
 List of people from Arkansas
 List of University of Arkansas people

References

Further reading
 

1876 births
1918 deaths
20th-century American male writers
20th-century American non-fiction writers
American bacteriologists
American Freemasons
American male non-fiction writers
American military personnel of the Philippine–American War
American military personnel of the Spanish–American War
American science writers
Arkansas National Guard personnel
Deaths from kidney disease
Military personnel from Arkansas
People from Jefferson County, Arkansas
People from Siloam Springs, Arkansas
University of Arkansas alumni
United States Army non-commissioned officers
United States Public Health Service personnel
Writers from Arkansas
Writers from Honolulu
Writers from Manila